Spider mites are members of the Tetranychidae family, which includes about 1,200 species. They are part of the subclass Acari (mites). Spider mites generally live on the undersides of leaves of plants, where they may spin protective silk webs, and they can cause damage by puncturing the plant cells to feed. Spider mites are known to feed on several hundred species of plants.

Description
They lay small, spherical, initially transparent eggs and many species spin silk webbing to help protect the colony from predators; they get the "spider" part of their common name from this webbing.

Life cycle

Hot, dry conditions are often associated with population build-up of spider mites. Under optimal conditions (approximately 27 °C), the two-spotted spider mite can hatch in as little as 3 days, and become sexually mature in as little as 5 days. One female can lay up to 20 eggs per day and can live for 2 to 4 weeks, laying hundreds of eggs. This accelerated reproductive rate allows spider mite populations to adapt quickly to resist pesticides, so chemical control methods can become somewhat ineffectual when the same pesticide is used over a prolonged period.

Spider mites, like hymenopterans and some scale insects, are haplodiploid and therefore arrhenotochous: females are diploid and males are haploid. When mated, females avoid the fecundation of some eggs to produce males. Fertilized eggs produce diploid females. Unmated, unfertilized females still lay eggs that originate exclusively haploid males.

To spread to new locations, they make use of ballooning for aerial dispersal.

Genera
The best known member of the group is Tetranychus urticae, which has a cosmopolitan distribution, and attacks a wide range of plants, including peppers, tomatoes, potatoes, beans, corn, cannabis, and strawberries. Other species which can be important pests of commercial plants include Panonychus ulmi (fruit tree red spider mite) and Panonychus citri (citrus red mite).

The family is divided into these subfamilies, tribes and genera:

Bryobinae Berlese
Bryobini Reck
Neoschizonobiella Tseng
Sinobryobia Ma et al.
Marainobia Meyer
Bryobia Koch
Toronobia Meyer
Pseudobryobia McGregor
Strunkobia Livshitz & Mitrofanov
Mezranobia Athias-Henriot
Eremobryobia Strunkova & Mitrofanov
Bryobiella Tuttle & Baker
Hemibryobia Tuttle & Baker

Hystrichonychini Pritchard & Baker
Bryocopsis Meyer
Tetranychopsis Canestrini
Notonychus Davis
Dolichonobia Meyer
Monoceronychus McGregor
Mesobryobia Wainstein
Hystrichonychus McGregor
Parapetrobia Meyer & Rykev
Peltanobia Meyer
Tauriobia Livshitz & Mitrofanov
Aplonobia Womersley
Paraplonobia Wainstein
Beerella Wainstein
Magdalena Baker & Tuttle
Porcupinychus Anwarullah
Afronobia Meyer

Petrobiini Reck
Neotrichobia Tuttle & Baker
Schizonobiella Beer & Lang
Schizonobia Womersley
Dasyobia Strunkova
Lindquistiella Mitrofanov
Edella Meyer
Petrobia Murray

Tetranychinae Berlese
Eurytetranychini Reck
Atetranychus Tuttle et al.
Synonychus Miller
Eurytetranychus Oudemans
Eurytetranychoides Reck
Eutetranychus Banks
Meyernychus Mitrofanov
Aponychus Rimando
Paraponychus Gonzalez & Flechtmann
Sinotetranychus Ma & Yuan
Anatetranychus Womersley
Duplanychus Meyer

Tenuipalpoidini Pritchard & Baker
Eonychus Gutierrez
Crotonella Tuttle et al.
Tenuipalpoides Reck & Bagdasarian
Tenuipalponychus Channabasavanna & Lakkundi

Tetranychini Reck
Brevinychus Meyer
Sonotetranychus Tuttle et al.
Mixonychus Meyer & Ryke
Evertella Meyer
Panonychus Yokoyama
Allonychus Pritchard & Baker
Schizotetranychus Trägårdh
Yunonychus Ma & Gao
Yezonychus Ehara
Neotetranychus Trägårdh
Acanthonychus Wang
Mononychellus Wainstein
Platytetranychus Oudemans
Eotetranychus Oudemans
Palmanychus Baker & Tuttle
Atrichoproctus Flechtmann
Xinella Ma & Wang
Oligonychus Berlese
Hellenychus Gutierrez
Tetranychus Dufour
Amphitetranychus Oudemans

Countermeasures

Neem oil
Neem oil may provide control, when combined with a suitable surfactant and diluted with water. As with chemical control, repeated applications are required.

Predatory mites
Predatory mites of the Phytoseiidae family, including Phytoseiulus persimilis, eat adult mites, their eggs, and all developmental stages between. Predatory mites can consume as many as 5 adult spider mites per day, or 20 eggs per day.

Harpin Alpha Beta
In some cases, the application of Harpin Alpha Beta protein may help in the treatment and prevention of infestation by stimulating the plant's natural defenses, restoring sap sugar levels and encouraging replacement of damaged tissues. This affects the spider mites' ability to down-regulate the immune response of a plant.

Acaricides
Acaricides are applied to crops to control spider mites. They can be either systemic or non-systemic in nature and can be persistent by providing residual activity for over a month. Drawbacks include high potential for development of resistance in mite populations, as has been observed in previous generations of miticides, and toxicity of some miticides towards fish. Thus proper selection, precautions and application are required to minimize risks.

Environmental conditions
Temporarily modifying environmental conditions has proven an effective method for insect pest control including spider mites. Generally dramatically decreased oxygen and increased carbon dioxide concentrations at elevated temperatures can lead to mortality at all developmental stages. However mild CO2 enrichment has been shown to in fact increase mite reproduction. One study determined a concentration of 0.4% O2 and 20% CO2 gave a LT99 (time to 99% mortality) of 113h at 20 °C and 15.5h at 40 °C. Another study reported 100% mortality of various stages of the two spotted spidermite using 60% CO2 and 20% O2 at 30 °C for 16h.
Advantages would include decreased ability for resistance development compared to miticides and potential ease of application while drawbacks might include sensitivity of the plant to the conditions, feasibility of application, and human safety.

See also 

Pests and diseases of roses

References

External links
 
 
 
 

Trombidiformes

fi:Vihannespunkki